Mădălin Daniel Stancu (born 6 January 1992) is a Romanian professional footballer who plays as a midfielder for Liga III side ACS Dumbrăvița.

References

External links
 

1992 births
Living people
Sportspeople from Timișoara
Romanian footballers
Association football midfielders
Liga I players
Liga II players
ACF Gloria Bistrița players
FC Bihor Oradea players
SSU Politehnica Timișoara players
CSC Dumbrăvița players